Salty Dog is a nickname for an ornery Sailor or a U.S. Marine who has spent much of his life aboard a ship at sea. A Salty Dog is also called old salt or true grit.

The phrase features prominently in Salty Dog Blues where it refers to the belief that applying salt to valuable hunting dogs would keep ticks away. In this context, a "salty dog" would be someone dear to the speaker's heart.    

"Salty dog" also means ornery, as in the T-Bone Walker tune "Ain't Salty No More".

References 

Nautical slang